Jure Robič (Slovenian: , Jesenice, Slovenia – , Plavški Rovt) was a Slovenian cyclist and a soldier in the Slovenian Army. He became prominent for his multiple wins in the men's solo category of Race Across America (RAAM). He was descending on his bike on a narrow mountain forest road in Plavški Rovt near Jesenice in Slovenia and hit an oncoming car.

Robič won the Race Across America (RAAM) 5 times (then a record in the men's solo category): in 2004, 2005, 2007, 2008 and 2010. He was in the second place at the final time station in 2009, but dropped out of the race in protest against what he found to be unfair time penalties awarded against him. For example, he received a time penalty for urinating in a non-designated place on the start day of the race, before the race even started. Robič swore never to enter RAAM again, but changed his mind and came back and won again in 2010.

On , Robič broke the world 24-hour road record by cycling  non-stop. In 2005, he won Le Tour Direct, (7d 19h 40m) a  race on a course derived from classic Tour de France routes. Robič won the DOS-Ras Race Across Slovenia four times, the Tour Direct twice, and the Tortour in 2010.

Robič was renowned for pushing himself to extreme mental breakdown during endurance races. He was laboratory-tested, and his abilities to produce power and to transport oxygen were found matching those of other top ultra-endurance champions worldwide. During the 2004 Race Across America, it was reported that he only slept for a total of eight hours during his eight-day,  ride across the United States.

From 1988 to 1994, Robič was a member of the Slovenian National Cycling Team. During that time, he was also a Slovenian national road champion. In his career he won more than 100 races and was on the podium at least 150 times. He was also a winner of Maraton Franja, Juriš na Vršič..

In addition to achievements in races, Robič was the recipient of the Sportsman of the Year awards for special achievements, Slovenian of the year for special achievements, and awards for fair play and tolerance in sport.

References

External links

 "Bicycle Dreams" Award Winning Documentary Film starring Jure Robic
 "Race Across America" NBC-TV Film detailing Jure Robic's First RAAM victory
 NY Times article
 Bikeradar.com article
 MSNBC article
 Radiolab episode featuring Robič
 "Hell on Two Wheels" award winning book about 2009 Race Across America featuring Robič

1965 births
2010 deaths
Slovenian male cyclists
Cycling road incident deaths
Road incident deaths in Slovenia
Sportspeople from Jesenice, Jesenice
Ultra-distance cyclists